Renata Kolbovic (born July 30, 1976) is a former tennis player, who was born in Czechoslovakia but competed for Canada.

Kolbovic had a professional career from 1996 to 2002. A resident of Vancouver, British Columbia, Kolbovic reached her highest individual ranking in the WTA Tour on December 4, 2000, when she became the No. 159 in the world.

Alongside Aneta Soukup, she won the bronze medal at the 1999 Pan American Games in Winnipeg, Canada.

WTA career finals

Doubles: 1 (1 runner-up)

ITF finals

Singles (1–9)

Doubles (12–13)

References

External links
 
 
 

1976 births
Living people
Canadian female tennis players
Czech female tennis players
Czechoslovak emigrants to Canada
Sportspeople from Brno
Sportspeople from Vancouver
Racket sportspeople from British Columbia
Tennis players at the 1999 Pan American Games
Pan American Games bronze medalists for Canada
Pan American Games medalists in tennis
Tennis players at the 1991 Pan American Games
Medalists at the 1999 Pan American Games